Dehlaqin (also Romanized as Dehlaqīn; also known as Dehlaq and Dehlaq-e Bālā) is a village in Khodabandehlu Rural District, in the Central District of Sahneh County, Kermanshah Province, Iran. At the 2006 census, its population was 414, in 113 families.

References 

Populated places in Sahneh County